As a nickname, Bam Bam may refer to:

People with the nickname 

 James Bamford (born 1967), Canadian stunt coordinator and stuntman
 Action Bronson (born 1983), American rapper
 Kam Chancellor (born 1988), American National Football League player
 Reshawn Davis (born 1978), American bodyguard and co-star of the reality TV series Rob & Big
 Terry Gordy (1961–2001), American professional wrestler
 John Michael Johnson (born 1968), bantamweight boxer, briefly world champion
 Brittany Lincicome (born 1985), American professional golfer
 Hensley Meulens (born 1967), former Major League Baseball player
 Daniel Rich (born 1990), Australian rules footballer
 Ken Weekes (1912–1998), West Indian cricketer
 Patrick Willis (born 1985), American National Football League player
 Iván Zamorano (born 1967), Chilean footballer

People with the ring name  

 Bam Bam Bigelow (1961–2007), American professional wrestler
 Bam Bam (wrestler) (born 1985), Mexican professional wrestler 
 Tai Tuivasa (born 1993), Australian rugby league player turned mixed martial artist of Samoan descent

People with the stage name 

 Bam Bam (radio presenter) (born 1970), a UK personality on Jack FM
 BamBam (singer) (born 1997),  Thai singer/rapper based in South Korea, member of Got7

See also 

 
 
 Bam Bam (disambiguation)

Lists of people by nickname